is a town located within the center of Kaisō District, Wakayama Prefecture, Japan. , the town had an estimated population of  8,362 in 4129 households and a population density of 65 persons per km².

Geography
Kimino is located in an inland area of north-central Wakayama prefecture. The Kishi River runs west through the central part of the town.

Neighboring municipalities
Wakayama Prefecture
Kainan
Kinokawa
Aridagawa
 Katsuragi

Climate
Kimino has a Humid subtropical climate (Köppen Cfa) characterized by warm summers and cool winters with light to no snowfall.  The average annual temperature in Kimino is 15.1 °C. The average annual rainfall is 1713 mm with September as the wettest month. The temperatures are highest on average in August, at around 26.2 °C, and lowest in January, at around 4.5 °C.

Demographics
Per Japanese census data, the population of Kimino has declined to almost half of what it was 60 years ago.

History
Kimino was founded on January 1, 2006, as a merger between the towns of Misato and Nokami, both from Kaisō District.

Government
Kimino has a mayor-council form of government with a directly elected mayor and a unicameral town council of 12 members. Kimino, collectively with the city of Kainan and the other municipalities of Kaisō District, contributes three members to the Wakayama Prefectural Assembly. In terms of national politics, the town is part of Wakayama 2nd district of the lower house of the Diet of Japan.

Economy
Agriculture, particularly horticulture, is the mainstay of the local economy.

Education
Kimino has three public elementary schools and two public middle schools operated by the town government and two public high schools operated by the Wakayama Prefectural Department of Education, which are branches of high schools in the city of Kainan. There are also two private high schools.

Transportation

Railway
Kimino has no passenger rail transport. The nearest train station is the JR West Kainan Station in the neighboring city of Kainan.

Highway

Local attractions 
 , a Shinto shrine along the >The  and two   are designated as Important Cultural Property of Japan.

References

External links 

  

Towns in Wakayama Prefecture
Kimino, Wakayama